John Rogerson may refer to:

John Rogerson (MP for Coventry), see Coventry
Sir John Rogerson (1648–1724), Irish politician, wealthy merchant and property developer; Member of Parliament for Clogher and Dublin City
John Rogerson (1676–1741), his son, Member of Parliament for Granard and Dublin City; Solicitor-General for Ireland, 1714–1720 
John Rogerson (physician) (born 1741), Scots born physician to the Russian court of Catherine the Great
John Bolton Rogerson (1809–1859), English poet 
John Rogerson (Barnard Castle MP) (1865–1925), Conservative Member of Parliament, 1922–1923
John W. Rogerson (1935–2018), biblical scholar and Church of England priest